Richard Bagge (17 June 1810 – 5 April 1891) was an English cricketer. Bagge's batting style is unknown. He was born at Stradsett, Norfolk.

The son of the Thomas Philip Bagge and Grace Salisbury, he was born at Stradsett Hall, and was educated at Charterhouse School. He married Pleasance Hulton on 1 October 1835, having six children with her. Bagge made two first-class cricket appearances for Norfolk in 1836, with both appearances coming against Yorkshire at New Ground, Norwich, and Hyde Park Ground, Sheffield. He scored 6 runs in his two matches, with a high score of 4.

A merchant by trade, Bagge later served as a Justice of the Peace, and as the High Sheriff of Norfolk in 1879. He died at Gaywood Hall in the village of Gaywood, Norfolk on 5 April 1891. His twin-brother, William, also played first-class cricket, later acquiring the title of the 1st Baronet of the Bagge Baronetcy. His son, Thomas, also played first-class cricket.

References

External links
Richard Bagge at ESPNcricinfo
Richard Bagge at CricketArchive

1810 births
1891 deaths
People from King's Lynn and West Norfolk (district)
People educated at Charterhouse School
English cricketers
Norfolk cricketers
English merchants
High Sheriffs of Norfolk
Twin sportspeople
English twins
19th-century English businesspeople